Ants in Your Pants is a Canadian children's music video television program made and aired by Treehouse TV that ran from November 1, 1997 to June 15, 2004. The series was created and produced by Kathilee Porter.

Plot
The show's intro consists mostly of CGI animations with the "Ants In Your Pants" theme, written by children's music artist Douglas John, whose music videos also appear on the show.

The host, a puppet monkey in corduroy overalls, named Lickety Split, then takes over. He lives in a tree with his mother (who is not seen, only heard or mentioned). He usually explains what he has been doing lately. A music video is shown. Usually, there are three music videos, separated by Lickety segments. After the last music video is played, an image of scattered leaves is shown before the next Lickety segment.

In the second segment, the Pesky Carpenter Ants, named Chainsaw, Woodchip and Dusty, are introduced. They frequently cause trouble for Lickety, but can also be helpful and kind on rare occasions.

In the third season, "Kidding Around" and "Stretch and Wiggle" are presented. "Kidding Around" features a CGI video camera showing kids doing fun activities or singing songs. "Stretch and Wiggle" (hosted by Shelley Hamilton and Corey Michaels, and sometimes Douglas John) shows exercises. The last segment before the end of the show is titled "Lickety's Tree Fort" and features a guest star. Guest stars include Al Simmons, Bob McGrath, Carmen Campagne, Jack Grunsky, Jackie Richardson and Ken Whiteley.

Cast
 Marty Stelnick as Lickety Split
 Jason Hopley, Ben Deustch, Colin Penman as Chainsaw, Woodchip, and Dusty

Soundtrack

Segments

Popularity
Ants in Your Pants was an entirely new concept in children's television. Although many children's programs (both then and now) were very musically based, this was the first known to feature music videos. As a result, the show became popular with Canadian children and was widely praised by adults. Its soundtrack was a Juno nominee in 2000 for Best Children's Album. A number of music videos from the program began appearing on YouTube in 2007, with the highest-viewed including "Tomato Hat" by a young Justin Hines and "Do Your Socks Get Soggy" by Douglas John, which each had more than 100,000 views as of January 2017. Other highly viewed videos include the Joe Scruggs songs "This Little Piggy", and "Bahamas Pajamas".

References

External links
 Wayback Machine Archive on TreehouseTV.com
 Douglas John Page archived by the Wayback Machine

Treehouse TV original programming
1990s Canadian children's television series
2000s Canadian children's television series
1990s Canadian music television series
2000s Canadian music television series
1999 Canadian television series debuts
2000 Canadian television series endings
Television series by Corus Entertainment
Television series about monkeys
Television series about insects
Canadian television shows featuring puppetry
Canadian children's musical television series
Canadian preschool education television series
1990s preschool education television series
2000s preschool education television series